The 60th Academy Awards ceremony, presented by the Academy of Motion Picture Arts and Sciences (AMPAS), took place on April 11, 1988, at the Shrine Auditorium in Los Angeles beginning at 6:00 p.m. PDT. During the ceremony, AMPAS presented Academy Awards (commonly referred to as Oscars) in 22 categories honoring films released in 1987. The ceremony, televised in the United States by ABC, was produced by Samuel Goldwyn Jr. and directed by Marty Pasetta. Actor Chevy Chase hosted the show for the second consecutive year. Two weeks earlier, in a ceremony held at the Beverly Hilton in Beverly Hills, California, on March 27, the Academy Awards for Technical Achievement were presented by host Shirley Jones.

The Last Emperor won all nine awards it was nominated for, including Best Picture and Best Director for Bernardo Bertolucci. For their performances in Moonstruck, Cher and Olympia Dukakis won Best Actress and Best Supporting Actress, respectively. Michael Douglas won Best Actor for his role in Wall Street; Sean Connery won Best Supporting Actor for The Untouchables. The telecast garnered 42.2 million viewers in the United States.

Winners and nominees

The nominees for the 60th Academy Awards were announced on February 16, 1988, at 5:38 PM PST (13:38 UTC) at the Samuel Goldwyn Theater in Beverly Hills, California, by Robert Wise, president of the Academy, and actress Shirley MacLaine. The Last Emperor received the most nominations with nine total; Broadcast News came in second with seven.

The winners were announced at the awards ceremony on April 11, 1988. The Last Emperor became the second film after 1958's Gigi to earn nine Oscar nominations and win all of them. For the first time in Oscar history, all five Best Director nominees were born outside the United States. Best Actor winner Michael Douglas became the second person to win Oscars for both acting and producing; he previously won a Best Picture award as co-producer of One Flew Over the Cuckoo's Nest.

Awards

Winners are listed first, highlighted in boldface, and indicated with a double dagger.

Irving G. Thalberg Memorial Award
The award honors "creative producers whose bodies of work reflect a consistently high quality of motion picture production".
Billy Wilder

Special Achievement Award
 Stephen Hunter Flick and John Pospisil, for the sound effects editing of RoboCop.

Multiple nominations and awards

The following 14 films received multiple nominations:

The following two films received multiple awards:

Presenters and performers
The following individuals, listed in order of appearance, presented awards or performed musical numbers.

Presenters

Performers

Ceremony information

In view of the 60th anniversary of the Academy Awards, the Academy hired film producer Samuel Goldwyn Jr. in October 1987 to oversee the telecast for the second straight year. Three months later, Goldwyn selected actor and comedian Chevy Chase to emcee the 1988 ceremony. In addition, after being held at the Dorothy Chandler Pavilion for almost two decades, AMPAS decided to move the telecast to the Shrine Auditorium in order to accommodate more rehearsal time and take advantage of the large venue's seating capacity. This marked the first time the facility served as the site for the Oscars since the 20th ceremony held in 1948. Additionally, Goldwyn and Passetta originally planned to feature pre-recorded red carpet arrivals footage of actors who had roles in the 59 previous Best Picture winners. However, the segment was dropped altogether due to traffic problems amongst guests arriving to the ceremony.

Furthermore, the 1988 Writers Guild of America strike, which began more than a month before the ceremony, affected the telecast and its surrounding events. Despite the Writers Guild of America refusing to grant a waiver permitting writers to work on the scripted dialogue for the gala, the three head writers for the telecast, Ernest Lehman, Melville Shavelson, and Jack Rose, assured to the Academy and ABC that more than half of the material had already been completed. To compensate for the missing portions of the script, Goldwyn heavily utilized comedians such as John Candy, Billy Crystal, Eddie Murphy, and Robin Williams to ad lib and improvise jokes. During the show, many of the participants expressed support for the writers such as Best Supporting Actor winner Sean Connery who remarked in his acceptance speech, "If such a thing as a wish accompanied this award mine would be that we ended the writers' strike."

Box office performance of nominated films
At the time of the nominations announcement on February 16, the combined gross of the five Best Picture nominees at the US box office was $221 million with an average of $48.9 million. Fatal Attraction was the highest earner among the Best Picture nominees with $142 million in the domestic box office receipts. The film was followed by Broadcast News ($36.7 million), Moonstruck ($25.4 million), The Last Emperor ($11.9 million), and Hope and Glory ($5.2 million).

Of the 50 highest-grossing movies of the year, 39 nominations went to 17 films on the list. Only Fatal Attraction (2nd), The Untouchables (4th), Good Morning Vietnam (10th), Throw Momma from the Train (14th), Full Metal Jacket (21st), Broadcast News (26th), Wall Street (30th), and Moonstruck (39th) were nominated for Best Picture, acting, directing, or screenwriting. The other top 50 box office hits that earned nomination were Beverly Hills Cop II (1st), Lethal Weapon (7th), The Witches of Eastwick (8th), Dirty Dancing (9th), Predator (11th), RoboCop (15th), Mannequin (23rd), The Princess Bride (38th), and Innerspace (45th).

Critical reviews
The telecast received a negative reception from media outlets. Los Angeles Times television critic Howard Rosenberg commented, "Monday night's Academy Awards telecast on ABC was the Michael Dukakis and George Bush of TV awards programs: parched, drab and leaden. You kept hoping they'd draft Mario Cuomo." Tom Shales from The Washington Post wrote, "Of hope there was little and of glory almost none last night at the 60th annual Academy Awards, telecast live from the Shrine Auditorium in Los Angeles on ABC. Even considering the low standards set in previous years, the program seemed unusually lackluster from the word go." Columnist Matt Roush of USA Today quipped, "Chevy Chase stopped the show. Cold. Over and over. As the ever-unctuous host, he tried to get laughs by picking his nose and sneezing into his hand when his ad-libs failed, which was often." He also observed that The Last Emperor domination of the awards created a dull and anticlimactic atmosphere to the proceedings.

Ratings and reception
The American telecast on ABC drew in an average of 42.2 million people over its length, which was a 13% increase from the previous year's ceremony. An estimated 70 million total viewers watched all or part of the awards. The show also drew higher Nielsen ratings compared to the previous ceremony with 29.2% of households watching over a 49 share.

In July 1988, the ceremony presentation received four nominations at the 40th Primetime Emmys. The following month, the ceremony won one of those nominations for Outstanding Variety Music Events Programming (Samuel Goldwyn, Jr.).

See also

 8th Golden Raspberry Awards
 30th Annual Grammy Awards
 41st British Academy Film Awards
 42nd Tony Awards
 45th Golden Globe Awards
 List of submissions to the 60th Academy Awards for Best Foreign Language Film

Notes 
A: Laurence Olivier was the first person to accomplish this feat. He won Best Picture as one of the producers of Hamlet and won Best Actor for playing the titular role in that same film.

References

Bibliography

External links

Official websites
 Academy Awards Official website
 The Academy of Motion Picture Arts and Sciences Official website

Analysis
 1987 Academy Awards Winners and History Filmsite.org
 Academy Awards, USA: 1988 Internet Movie Database

Other resources
 

1987 film awards
1988 in Los Angeles
Academy Awards ceremonies
1988 in American cinema
April 1988 events in the United States
Academy
Television shows directed by Marty Pasetta